Katarina Srebotnik was the defending champion, lost in the second round to Tzipora Obziler.

Marion Bartoli won the title, beating Vera Zvonareva 6–2, 6–2 in the final.

Draw

Seeds

Finals

Top half

Bottom half

External links
 ITF tournament edition details

WTA Auckland Open